April Blair is an American writer and producer of film and television. Blair has written scripts for the films, Christmas Caper, Private Valentine: Blonde & Dangerous, Lemonade Mouth and Wednesday. She also co-wrote with director Tom Bezucha, the film Monte Carlo starring Selena Gomez, Leighton Meester and Katie Cassidy. Blair is also the creator and executive producer of the 2012 Freeform (formerly ABC Family until 2016) series Jane by Design. In 2021, she started writing for the TV series Gossip Girl.

References

External links

American television producers
American women television producers
American television writers
Living people
American women screenwriters
American women television writers
Place of birth missing (living people)
Year of birth missing (living people)
21st-century American women